John William Slaby (September 23, 1934 – January 3, 2017) was an American lawyer and politician.

Slaby was born in Ashland, Wisconsin. He graduated from University of Wisconsin–Madison, in 1956, and received his law degree from University of Wisconsin Law School in 1958. He practiced law in Phillips, Wisconsin. Slaby served as district attorney for Price County, Wisconsin from 1960 to 1971 and was a Democrat. Slaby served in the Wisconsin Assembly in 1971 and 1972. He died in Naples, Florida.

References

People from Ashland, Wisconsin
People from Phillips, Wisconsin
Democratic Party members of the Wisconsin State Assembly
District attorneys in Wisconsin
University of Wisconsin Law School alumni
1934 births
2017 deaths